Paul Jonas Johnson (born ) is a Swedish former professional ice hockey player. He spent ten seasons as centre, playing for Frölunda HC in the Swedish elite league Elitserien. Johnson also served as Frölunda's captain for five years before retiring after the 2007-08 season. In mid January, 2009, Frölunda reported that Johnson is training with the team due to the numerous injuries in the team. Johnson has two sons, Jonathan Johnson who plays with Frölunda HC (currently on loan to IK Oskarshamn of Allsvenskan) and Andreas Johnson, a 2013 draft pick currently playing for the New Jersey Devils.

Career statistics

Regular season and playoffs

International

References

External links

1970 births
Brynäs IF players
Frölunda HC players
IF Björklöven players
St. Louis Blues draft picks
Swedish ice hockey centres
Swedish expatriate ice hockey players in Germany
Living people
People from Gävle
Sportspeople from Gävleborg County